This is a list of all managers of Kasımpaşa, including honours.

Managers

Records

Nationalities

Most games managed

References

External links 
Official website

Kasımpaşa S.K. managers